This is an incomplete list of films produced in Denmark in year order. For an alphabetical list of films currently on Wikipedia see :Category:Danish films.

List of films by decade
 List of Danish films before 1910
 List of Danish films of the 1910s
 List of Danish films of the 1920s
 List of Danish films of the 1930s
 List of Danish films of the 1940s
 List of Danish films of the 1950s
 List of Danish films of the 1960s
 List of Danish films of the 1970s
 List of Danish films of the 1980s
 List of Danish films of the 1990s
 List of Danish films of the 2000s
 List of Danish films of the 2010s
 List of Danish films of the 2020s

See also
Cinema of Denmark
List of Danish film directors

External links
 Danish film at the Internet Movie Database
 Danish Film Institute (in Danish and English), includes:
 Danish Film Database
 Danish Film History
 Danish Film, on The Official Website of Denmark (available in Danish, English and other languages)

 

da:Danske film